The women's 1500 metres event at the 2005 Summer Universiade was held on 16–18 August in Izmir, Turkey.

Medalists

Results

Heats

Final

References
Finals results
Full results

Athletics at the 2005 Summer Universiade
2005 in women's athletics
2005